The Great Western Railway (GWR) Star Class of 2-2-2 broad gauge steam locomotives were used for passenger train work. Designed by Robert Stephenson, the class was introduced into service between November 1838 and November 1841, and withdrawn between April 1864 and September 1871.

A total of twelve Star Class locomotives were manufactured. Notably, they were given the romantic or colloquial (rather than scientific) names of astronomical bodies. By the time the last had been delivered, GWR engineer Daniel Gooch had designed and taken delivery of several of his larger Firefly Class.

North Star and Morning Star

 North Star (1837–1871)
North Star arrived at Maidenhead Bridge station by barge on 28 November 1837; on 31 May 1838 it worked the inaugural train for the company's directors. It was withdrawn in 1871 but kept at Swindon, along with Lord of the Isles, until 1906. It was then dismantled but many parts were recovered to build the later replica.

'The north star' is one of two common alternative names for Polaris (its other being 'the pole star'). It is the only visible polar star in either hemisphere, and has long been used for navigation due to its constant fixed and unmoving appearance due north in the night sky.  The commercial park north of Swindon Station is called North Star after the engine and includes streets named North Star Avenue and Polaris Way.

 Morning Star (1839–1869)
This, the second Star Class, was not delivered until 14 months after the North Star.

Named after 'the morning star', the common periodic name for the planet Venus (at times the brightest object in the night sky) when seen in the eastern sky just before sunrise, its motion then appearing to "lead" the sun for many mornings.

Later locomotives

 Bright Star (1841–1864)
A 'bright star' is one clearly visible in the night sky, and generally denotes one of a few that appear to shine more than most.
 Dog Star (1839–1869)
After withdrawal, Dog Star was used as a stationary boiler at Paddington. Named after 'the dog star', the common name for Sirius, brightest star in the night sky and found in the constellation Canis Major (Lat: 'greater dog', from whence Sirius' common name).
 Evening Star (1839–1871)
Named after 'the evening star', the common periodic name for the planet Venus (at times the brightest object in the night sky) when seen in the western sky just before sunset, its motion then appearing to "follow" the sun for many evenings.
 Lode Star (1841–1870)
A 'lodestar' denotes any easily found star that is used to aid navigation (for example Polaris). Now an archaic term, in Middle English it meant 'course star' or 'lead star'.
 Polar Star (1840–1870)
This locomotive was built with  cylinders. It was rebuilt as a 4-2-2T tank locomotive. Its name is assisted with navigation: a polar star is one that appears fixed and unmoving over the Earth's North or South Pole and is thus used for a guide. The only one visible is Polaris (aka. the Pole Star or North Star).
 Red Star (1840–1865)
This locomotive was rebuilt as a 4-2-2T tank locomotive. Its name has no particular association with any specific star, although prominent red stars visible from the northern hemisphere include Aldebaran, Arcturus, Antares and Betelgeuse.
 Rising Star (1840–1871)
This locomotive had a  wheelbase; at some time it was rebuilt as a 4-2-2T tank locomotive. On 7 September 1841 it ran over an earthslip near Chippenham, but the rest of the train (including Tiger, coupled behind) was derailed. The locomotive's name reflected the company's status: a 'rising star' is the term for any star appearing to climb the sky (rather than moving low across the horizon), and is often used metaphorically to mean someone "new" whose reputation is increasing rapidly.
 Royal Star (1841–1871)
This locomotive was built with  cylinders and a  wheelbase. The four Persian 'royal stars' are Aldebaran, Regulus, Antares and Fomalhaut, said to guard the four quarters of the annual night sky.
 Shooting Star (1841–1871)
This locomotive was rebuilt as a 4-2-2T tank locomotive. A 'shooting star' is the descriptive term for a meteor.
 Western Star (1841–1866)
This locomotive was built with  cylinders and a  wheelbase. After withdrawal it was used as a stationary boiler at Oxford. Its name reflected the GWR's westerly direction: 'the western star' has no particular association with any specific star (although Antares was the quarter guardian of the western gate in Persian 'royal star' mythology).

Replica

A non-working replica of North Star was constructed for the 1923 Cavalcade, and is now housed at Swindon Steam Railway Museum.

It made use of some of the parts of the original North Star, scrapped as recently as 1906, but is not capable of being steamed. Although it was featured in the railway's centenary film in 1935, it was pushed by another locomotive.

References

 
 
 

Star
2-2-2 locomotives
4-2-2 locomotives
Broad gauge (7 feet) railway locomotives
Early steam locomotives
Steam locomotives of Great Britain
Robert Stephenson and Company locomotives
Railway locomotives introduced in 1837
Passenger locomotives